Rasbora armitagei is a minnow endemic to Sri Lanka. The fish was discovered from a small tributary of Kalu Ganga at Rakwana, South-Western Wet zone, Sri Lanka. This species is named after naturalist David Armitage.

See also
Rasbora naggsi

References

Rasboras
Taxa named by Anjana Silva
Taxa named by Kalana Maduwage
Taxa named by Rohan Pethiyagoda
Fish described in 2010